The 1995 Scotland rugby union tour of Zimbabwe was a series of matches played in May and June 1995 in Zimbabwe by a selection of Scottish players. It was a "Development team", that visit Zimbabwe while the Scottish official team was playing the 1995 Rugby World Cup in South Africa.

Results 

Scores and results list Scotland XV's points tally first.

References

1995 rugby union tours
1995
1995
1994–95 in Scottish rugby union
1995 in African rugby union
rugby union